The 1862 Philadelphia mayoral election saw the reelection of Alexander Henry to a third consecutive term. It was the first Philadelphia mayoral election to a three-year term, as previous elections since 1854 had been for two-year terms.

Results

References

1862
Philadelphia
Philadelphia mayoral
19th century in Philadelphia